Jan Bernard Szlaga (May 24, 1940 – April 25, 2012) was the Roman Catholic bishop of the Roman Catholic Diocese of Pelplin, Poland. He was born the youngest of six children of Jan and Helena (Sciesińska) Szlaga.

Education and early career
From 1947 to 1953 Szlaga attended elementary school in Gdynia and then went attended Collegium Leoninum in Wejherowo and Collegium Marianum in Pelplin. He studied at the Pelplin Higher Seminary ( Wyższe Seminarium Duchowne w Pelplinie) and was ordained a Roman Catholic priest in Chelmno (Culma, Kulm) in 1963. From 1965 to 1969 Father Szlaga continued his biblical studies at the Catholic University of Lublin and from 1972 to 1973 at the Pontifical Biblical Institute in Rome. Upon completing his doctorate in theology, Szlaga took on academic duties in addition to his priestly duties:

 Assistant to Professor of Biblical Studies, Catholic University of Lublin
 Vice-Dean at Catholic University of Lublin
 Dean of the Faculty of Theology 1981-1984
 Lecturer at the Major Seminary in Lublin, Pelplin Seminary and Nicolaus Copernicus University in Toruń.
 Professor at the University of Gdańsk's Faculty of Languages and History 1991-2001
 Member of the Studiorum Novi Testamenti Societas
 Ordinary Member of the Scientific Society of CUL

As bishop
In 1988, Father Szlaga was named Auxiliary Bishop of Chelmno and Titular Bishop of Mascula. In 1992 he was consecrated as Bishop of Pelplin. While serving as Bishop he received Commander's Cross of the Order of Polish Rebirth.  He was named an honorary citizen of Chojnice (1994), Starogard Gdański (2007) and Gdynia (2008), and received the 2010 Award For Services to Pomerania.

Szlaga's health declined just before he was to act as main consecrator of the new Auxiliary Bishop Wiesław Śmigiel and he died on April 25, 2012. He is buried beside the altar at the Cathedral Basilica of the Assumption of the Blessed Virgin Mary at Pelplin Abbey.

References

21st-century Roman Catholic bishops in Poland
Polish people of Kashubian descent
Kashubian clergy
1940 births
2012 deaths
People from Pelplin
Pontifical Biblical Institute alumni
John Paul II Catholic University of Lublin alumni
Academic staff of Nicolaus Copernicus University in Toruń
20th-century Roman Catholic bishops in Poland